594913 ꞌAylóꞌchaxnim (provisional designation ) is a large near-Earth asteroid discovered by the Zwicky Transient Facility on 4 January 2020. It is the first asteroid discovered to have an orbit completely within Venus's orbit, and is thus the first and only known member of the eponymous ꞌAylóꞌchaxnim (informally named Vatira before its discovery) population of Atira-class asteroids. ꞌAylóꞌchaxnim has the smallest known aphelion and third-smallest known semi-major axis among all asteroids.

Discovery 
ꞌAylóꞌchaxnim was discovered by the Zwicky Transient Facility (ZTF) survey at the Palomar Observatory on 4 January 2020, by astronomers Bryce Bolin, Frank Masci, and Quanzhi Ye. The discovery formed part of a campaign for detecting interior-Earth asteroids (Atiras) using the wide-field ZTF camera on the 1.22-meter Samuel Oschin telescope at the Palomar Observatory. The detection of such objects is difficult due to their close proximity to the Sun: asteroids within the orbit of Venus never reach solar elongations greater than 47 degrees, meaning that they are only observable during twilight as the Sun is below the Earth's horizon. Because of this, inner-Venusian asteroids could only be observed within a short time frame, hence why the ZTF camera was used since it can effectively detect transient objects.

At the time of discovery, ꞌAylóꞌchaxnim was located in the constellation Aquarius, at an apparent magnitude around 18. The discovery of ꞌAylóꞌchaxnim was reported by astronomer Bryce Bolin, and was subsequently listed on the Minor Planet Center's Near-Earth Object Confirmation Page (NEOCP) on 4 January 2020. Follow-up observations were then conducted at various observatories in order to determine the asteroid's orbit based on its orbital motion. The discovery of the asteroid was then formally announced in a Minor Planet Electronic Circular issued by the MPC on 8 January 2020. Follow-up observations were later conducted in November 2020 by the Palomar and Xingming observatories, reducing ꞌAylóꞌchaxnim's uncertainty parameter to 5.

Given the difficulty of detecting such asteroids at small solar elongations, they estimated that at least one additional Vatira asteroid will be detected by the ZTF.

Nomenclature 
Upon discovery, the asteroid was given the internal designation ZTF09k5. The Minor Planet Center (MPC) gave it the provisional designation  on 8 January 2020, after follow-up observations sufficiently determined its orbit. After its orbit had been determined to sufficient precision, the MPC assigned it the permanent number 594913 on 20 September 2021. Its name was approved on 8 November 2021.  means 'Venus girl' in the indigenous Luiseño language of southern California. The name celebrates the location of the discovery (Palomar Mountain, which is on ancestral Luiseño land) and the fact that ꞌAylóꞌchaxnim is the first discovered asteroid to orbit entirely within the orbit of Venus. Being the prototype of the informally named Vatira class, its name is expected to be used to refer to this newly confirmed population.

Orbit and classification 

ꞌAylóꞌchaxnim is the only asteroid known to have an orbit completely within Venus's orbit. With an aphelion distance of approximately 0.654 astronomical units (AU), it has the smallest known aphelion of all asteroids. In comparison, Venus's average orbital distance from the Sun is 0.723 AU, with a perihelion distance of 0.718 AU. ꞌAylóꞌchaxnim is formally classified as an Atira asteroid by the Minor Planet Center due it having an orbit within that of Earth.

The asteroid orbits the Sun in approximately 151 days (0.41 years), with a semi-major axis of approximately 0.5554 AU. 's orbit is close to a 3:2 mean-motion orbital resonance with Venus, meaning that ꞌAylóꞌchaxnim completes approximately three orbits for every two orbits completed by Venus. The orbit of ꞌAylóꞌchaxnim is moderately eccentric, as it approaches only 0.457 AU from the Sun at perihelion, just within Mercury's aphelion distance of 0.467 AU. ꞌAylóꞌchaxnim's orbit is also moderately inclined to the ecliptic by approximately 15.9 degrees. ꞌAylóꞌchaxnim has a smaller orbital eccentricity and inclination compared to the generally expected values for typical Vatira asteroids, which were predicted to have an eccentricity around 0.4 and an inclination around 25 degrees.

ꞌAylóꞌchaxnim is approximately tied with  (0.5553 AU) as having the second-smallest known orbital period and semi-major axis among all asteroids, though  has a slightly smaller semi-major axis. In this case, ꞌAylóꞌchaxnim has the third-smallest known semi-major axis among all asteroids.

Orbital dynamics 
ꞌAylóꞌchaxnim had likely originated from the main asteroid belt, where its orbit was locked in a secular resonance that caused its orbital eccentricity to gradually increase over time, evolving onto an Earth-crossing orbit. Subsequent close encounters with Earth, Venus, and Mercury resulted in gravitational perturbations of the asteroid's orbit, reducing its momentum and causing it to orbit closer to the Sun. Such inward orbital migration of objects is thought to be rare. Near-Earth asteroids transitioning into the Vatira region often have unstable, short-term orbits due to frequent gravitational perturbations by Venus and Mercury. ꞌAylóꞌchaxnim rarely crosses the orbits of Mercury and Venus, which reduces the number of close encounters with either planet that would otherwise perturb ꞌAylóꞌchaxnim's orbit. Nevertheless its orbit is likely to be stable for less than a million years, unless it is on (or enters soon) a nearby 3:2 mean-motion resonance with Venus, which could extend its stability to a few million years.

Dynamical modeling of ꞌAylóꞌchaxnim's orbit show that the most likely scenario for its orbital evolution is that ꞌAylóꞌchaxnim's orbit will oscillate for several millions of years before gravitational perturbations lead to the asteroid's eventual collision with a planet, most likely Venus. At 140 thousand years from the present, ꞌAylóꞌchaxnim's aphelion distance will exceed Venus's perihelion distance, as a result of the combined effects of the Kozai resonance and gravitational perturbations. Within the Vatira region, the Kozai resonance causes the orbital inclinations and eccentricities of asteroids to oscillate over several millions of years. As a result, Vatira asteroids can become Atira-class asteroids and vice versa over time, and can cross the orbits of Mercury and Venus during these orbital oscillations. The Kozai resonance often disrupts the orbits of Vatira asteroids, albeit it can also lead to orbital stability for some unperturbed Vatira asteroids. At about 1.2 million years from the present, ꞌAylóꞌchaxnim will leave the Vatira region and will transition onto a Mercury-crossing orbit, with its perihelion oscillating around Mercury's aphelion distance before decoupling from the planet's orbit at about 2.1 million years.

After decoupling from Mercury's orbit, ꞌAylóꞌchaxnim was shown to oscillate between an Atira-type orbit (Q < 0.983 AU) and an Earth-crossing Aten-type orbit (Q > 0.983 AU), in which the asteroid's aphelion oscillates around Earth's perihelion distance of 0.983 AU. About 740 thousand years afterward, ꞌAylóꞌchaxnim will likely return to its Mercury-crossing orbit, though gravitational perturbations by Mercury and Venus will scatter it onto an Earth-crossing orbit once more before colliding with either planet. At about 4.1 million years from the present, ꞌAylóꞌchaxnim will most likely collide with Venus.

Modeling of the observational selection effects of the Zwicky Transient Facility survey shows a small probability of it detecting ꞌAylóꞌchaxnim based on the current NEO model. The low probability of detection may imply an additional source of ꞌAylóꞌchaxnim asteroids in the inner Solar System such as within the orbit of Mercury.

Physical characteristics 
ꞌAylóꞌchaxnim is estimated to have an absolute magnitude (H) of approximately 16.2. Near-Earth asteroid population models predict that at least one asteroid of this size has an orbit within that of Venus, implying that ꞌAylóꞌchaxnim could be one of the largest members of the Vatira population.

Visible and near-infrared spectroscopy by the Roque de los Muchachos Observatory in 2020 suggests that ꞌAylóꞌchaxnim has a reddish surface that is olivine-rich, based on the presence of a 1 μm absorption feature characteristic of S-type asteroids. The abundance of olivine in the surface of ꞌAylóꞌchaxnim suggests that it could be a mantle asteroid formed as a fragment from the rocky mantles of large, internally differentiated bodies. The absorption features in ꞌAylóꞌchaxnim's spectrum appear to be intermediate between the S-type and A-type spectral classes, hence it is classified as an Sa-type asteroid.

See also 
 Vulcanoids – a hypothetical population of asteroids within Mercury's orbit
 , a dynamically-changing Atira asteroid that may have once been a Vatira asteroid
 , a temporary quasi-satellite of Venus
 , the first known Venus trojan

Notes

References

External links 
 2020 AV2, the first intervenusian asteroid ever discovered, Gianluca Masi, The Virtual Telescope Project 2.0, 9 Jan 2020
 Meet 2020 AV2, the first asteroid found that stays inside Venus's orbit!, by Phil Plait, 10 Jan 2020
 Meet 2020 AV2, the 1st asteroid entirely within the orbit of Venus, by Gianluca Masi, 10 Jan 2020
 First asteroid found within Venus's orbit could be a clue to missing 'mantle' asteroids, Nola Redd, Science, 1 July 2020 
 
 

Atira asteroids
Discoveries by the Zwicky Transient Facility
Aylochaxnim

20200104
20200104